The Adventures of Grady Greenspace is a children's TV programme that was originally a French/Canadian programme called "Les Enquêtes de Chlorophylle" (roughly translated as "The Investigations of Chlorophylle"), which was co-produced by Damned Productions (Paris), la Société Française de Production, France 3, Productions Espace Vert (Montreal) and Logos Distribution  and aired between 1992 and 1993 .

The UK version was produced by Central Independent Television from 1994 to 1995.

The series was based on the character Chlorophylle created by Raymond Macherot and published by Le Lombard and was about a group of environmentally aware creatures and their adventures.

The shows characters were a combination of around twelve puppets and a large number of live animals.

Characters

Puppets
Chlorophylle (French) / Grady Greenspace (English) - The show's main protagonist. A black and white dormouse that solved crimes and environmental issues with the aid of his friends. Grady lived inside an old building and slept in a human's old slipper.
Radar -  a bat and close friend of Grady.
Bulgy - a frog and close friend of Grady.
Anthracite (French) / Scuzzy (English) - The main antagonist of the series. Scuzzy was a black rat and leader of a group of animals called the Rafia or the "Creepy Crawlers", who were usually the cause of the problem that Grady was trying to solve. Occasionally, however, Grady and Scuzzy had to join forces to deal with other antagonists. 
Maeva (French) / Rhonda (English) - A white rat that was the sister of Scuzzy, but far sweeter and nicer than her brother. She was also Grady's love interest.

Live Animals
The Council - A group of owls that Grady would often consult when he needed advice

Cast and crew

Directors
Frédéric Goupil
Claude Grégoire
Michel Marin
Bruno Carrière

Production Manager
Karine Dhont

Writers
Michel Marin
Diane Cailhier

Cinematography
Jacques Meynard

Voice Actors
Terrence Scammell - lead voice actor for English version.

Episodes
There were 52 episodes in total. Known episodes:
 Vote For Grady - first aired in the UK on 03/05/1995.
 Shady Business - first aired in the UK on 17/05/1995.

External links
More info on BFI.ORG.UK
Synopsis of "Les Enquêtes de Chlorophylle"
Crew listing at IMDb
Biography of Bruno Carrière
Screenshots at www.telenostalgie.com
Bring Back Grady Greenspace fansite

ITV children's television shows
1992 French television series debuts
1995 French television series endings
1990s French television series
1990s Canadian children's television series
French children's television series
Television series by ITV Studios
Television shows produced by Central Independent Television
Canadian television shows featuring puppetry
French television shows featuring puppetry
Television series based on Belgian comics
1990s British children's television series
Dormice